Nebojsa V. Radunovic is a university professor of obstetrics and gynecology at University of Belgrade's School of Medicine * Reference 1, Chair of  Human reproduction department at Institute for Obstetrics and Gynecology, Clinical Center of Serbia and a corresponding member of the Serbian Academy of Sciences and Arts. He was born in 1954 in Kosovska Mitrovica, Kosovo, then SFRY.

Training 
He received his M.D. with special distinction from the Belgrade Medical School in 1978. In 1982 he was awarded his master's degree, and in 1985 he completed his PhD studies at the same faculty. In 1986 he was given the title of assistant professor. In 1998 he was elected associate professor and in 2001, he was appointed as full professor.

He completed a residency in obstetrics and gynecology 1985. and a fellowship in perinatal medicine in 1987 at the Institute for Obstetrics and Gynecology at University of Belgrade.

After spending four years in the Department of High risk pregnancy at Institute for Obstetrics and  Gynecology University of Belgrade, he was awarded a Fulbright Foundation fellowship and worked at Mount Sinai School of Medicine from 1990 to 1991. Since 1997 he has served as adjunct professor of Clinical Obstetrics at the Department of Obstetrics and Gynecology at the New York University (NYU) School of Medicine.

Radunovic has garnered multiple teaching awards, has authored many peer-reviewed publications, and chapters and invited reviews on high risk pregnancy, prenatal diagnosis, fetal pathology and fetal therapy.

His service to professional organizations includes work as the president of South east European Society for Perinatal Medicine, President of Serbian Society for perinatal medicine, member of educational committee of European Association for Perinatal Medicine and  board member of International society – Fetus as a Patient.

Research
Radunovic's primary research interests include the fetal physiology and pathophysiology, the pathogenesis of adverse pregnancy outcomes associated with assisted reproduction techniques and maternal inherited diseases, and the pathogenesis and prediction of preterm delivery. Notable discoveries include elucidation of mechanisms underlying fetal reaction and adaptation to intrauterine invasive diagnostic and therapeutic procedures CVS, AC, Cordocentesis, Intrauterine transfusions and fetal shunting).

References

Living people
People from Mitrovica, Kosovo
Academic staff of the University of Belgrade
University of Belgrade Faculty of Medicine alumni
New York University faculty
Year of birth missing (living people)
Kosovan obstetricians